The Starland Ballroom is a concert venue located in Sayreville, New Jersey. Beginning in the 1960s, the building was known as the Jernee Mill Inn, a local bar with a banquet hall. It was originally known as the Hunka Bunka Ballroom and then Willy's  in the 1980s. It has operated as a dance music club but more often hosted concerts with primarily metal, punk and ska lineups.

History
The venue opened in August 1962 as a banquet hall and tavern by brothers Chester, Frank and Edward (Rusty) Cholewa. The hall was known as the Jernee Mill Inn, named after the main road near the building. In the late 70s, Rusty's wife, Phyllis decided to use the space as a concert venue, to fill the gaps in wedding and party reservations.

In 1982, the venue was purchased by Bernie Bailey. During this time, the main hall was used as a rehearsal space, during dark days. Around this time, John Bongiovi Jr. and Richard Sambora met at the venue before forming Bon Jovi.

Five years later, Bailey changed the name to the Hunka Bunka Ballroom and concerts served as the primary focus of the venue.  As the Hunka Bunka, the club became one of Central Jersey's premier concert venues, catering to major and independent rock, country and hip-hop artists.

In October 2003, it was announced the Hunka Bunka was undergoing needed renovations. Independent concert promoter, Concerts East, signed on to operate the venue and promote its shows. Within five weeks, the club reopened as the Starland Ballroom, with a show by David Lee Roth.

Years later, Bailey and his partners (Frank Sementa and Kip Connor) sold the property to AEG. From 2007 to 2017, AEG Live (now AEG Presents) were the owners and operators of the building. In 2017, AEG Live purchased 50% of The Bowery Presents, with the latter becoming the operator of the venue.

In 2012, the venue saw significant damage because of Hurricane Sandy. The storm caused the Raritan River to flood, with the club being engulfed in six feet of water. The result was damage to the walls, flooring, electrical system and plumbing. The building closed late October 2012, canceling all concerts until March 2013. Renovation efforts began mid-November 2013, with 24 local contractors contributing to rebuilding the club. Renovations include adding a mezzanine in the rear of the main hall, updated lighting, improved sightlines, and acoustics, redesign of the backstage area and the dressing rooms. Flooding parameters were put in place to prevent any water damage in the future.

While the venue was slated to reopen in March 2013, AEG announced the club was set to reopen in September. Tickets for forthcoming events went on sale in June. The grand reopening took place on September 6, 2013, with a concert by Stone Temple Pilots.

From 2003 to 2013, it is reported the venue sold 1.3 million tickets.

Events 
Taking Back Sunday has been hosting an annual Holiday Spectacular every year in December since 2013.

Coheed and Cambria filmed a concert and released it on DVD called Live at the Starland Ballroom.

MTV Classic's That Metal Show filmed at least one episode at the venue.

In 2005, the Starland hosted a pair of concerts to raise money for victims of the December 26 tsunamis. My Chemical Romance, Taking Back Sunday, Senses Fail and dozens more performed over two nights, raising over $150,000 for UNICEF and the International Red Cross.

In September 2005, Dashboard Confessional and Coheed and Cambria co-headlined an event to raise $80,000 for Direct Relief International's efforts to assist victims of the Hurricane Katrina disaster.

In 2022, Ken Carson was the first member of Opium, a Label started by Atlanta Rapper Playboi Carti, to headline a show at Starland on Halloween weekend. Openers included Lucki's DJ, Killa Kam. His performance was controversial due to Carson cutting his set a half hour early, after fans knew all the words to his (at the time) unreleased song, Freestyle 3, which he would release on Halloween as part of the Deluxe Version of his first studio album X, better known to fans as XTENDED

Noted performers 

Against Me!
Airbourne
All That Remains
Amon Amarth
Anaka
Anthrax
As I Lay Dying
Alice in Chains
Atreyu
Avenged Sevenfold
Bad Religion
Ben Folds
Billy Currington
Biology
Black Label Society
Blink-182
Bo Burnham
The Bouncing Souls
Brian Fallon
Bruce Springsteen
Buckcherry
Bullet For My Valentine
Cannibal Corpse
Chester Bennington
Chris Brown
Collective Soul
Childish Gambino
Clutch
D.R.I.
DMC 
Dashboard Confessional
Death Angel
Dierks Bentley
Disco Biscuits
Dokken
The Doobie Brothers
Dropkick Murphys
E.Town Concrete
Every Time I Die
Fall Out Boy
Finger Eleven
From Autumn to Ashes
Garbage
The Get Up Kids
God Forbid
Gogol Bordello
Good Charlotte
Green Day 
Greta Van Fleet
Guster
Gwar
HIM
Hanson
Hatebreed
Hollywood Undead
Iced Earth
Jackyl
Jimmy Eat World
Johnny Maestro & the Brooklyn Bridge
Justin Timberlake
Kacey Musgraves
Ken Carson (rapper)
Killswitch Engage
Kix
Knocked Loose
L.A. Guns
Lamb of God
Lifehouse
Mastodon
Megadeth
Metallica
The Mighty Mighty Bosstones
Misfits
Modest Mouse
Motionless In White
Motorhead
My Chemical Romance 
Nelly Furtado
New York Dolls
The Offspring
Overkill
Papa Roach
Paramore
Parkway Drive
Parliament-Funkadelic
Peaches & Herb
Puddle of Mudd
Queensrÿche 
Reel Big Fish
Rob Zombie
Ryan Adams
Saves the Day
Seether
Sevendust
Skid Row
Skillet
Social Distortion
Staind
The Starting Line
Streetlight Manifesto
Sum 41
Tesla
Testament
The 1975
Thin Lizzy
Third Eye Blind 
Three Days Grace
Thursday 
Toad the Wet Sprocket
Trace Adkins
Trivium
Twisted Sister
Two Door Cinema Club
Velvet Underground
Volbeat
Warrant
W.A.S.P. (band)
Wu-Tang Clan
Yngwie Malmsteen
Ziggy Marley

See also 
 New Brunswick, New Jersey music scene

References

External links 
 Starland Ballroom on Twitter
 Starland Ballroom on Facebook
 Starland Ballroom on Instagram
 Starland Ballroom on concertarchives.org

1962 establishments in New Jersey
Buildings and structures in Middlesex County, New Jersey
Concert halls in New Jersey
Music venues in New Jersey
Sayreville, New Jersey
Tourist attractions in Middlesex County, New Jersey
Nightclubs in New Jersey
Music venues completed in 1962